Errol Smith was a Scotland international rugby union player.

Rugby Union career

Amateur career

He played for Edinburgh Academicals.

Provincial career

Smith was capped by East of Scotland District to play against West of Scotland District at the start of March 1879.

International career

He was capped only the once for Scotland; against Ireland on 17 February 1879.

References

1859 births
1902 deaths
Scottish rugby union players
Scotland international rugby union players
Edinburgh Academicals rugby union players
East of Scotland District players
Rugby union players from Edinburgh
Rugby union forwards